Khairo Buriro is a town in the Sindh province of Pakistan. It is located at 27°26'15N 68°46'20E with an altitude of 59 metres (196 feet). Khairo Buriro or Khairy jo Goth was renamed as Jani Buriro, after Jani who was headman of the village.

References

Populated places in Sindh